Dixon Springs State Park is an Illinois state park in Pope County, Illinois, United States, and is one of several state parks in the Illinois Shawnee Hills. The park is on a giant block of rock which was dropped  along a fault that extends northwesterly across Pope County. The first land acquisition was in 1946.

History 
The area around the park was occupied by various tribes of Algonquins who, after the Shawnee had been driven from Tennessee, had settled near the mouth of the Wabash River. Dixon Springs was one of their favorite camping grounds and was called "Kitchemuske-nee-be" for the Great Medicine Waters. One of the better known Indian trails, which the early French called the "Grand Trace," passed to the west of the park and south to Fort Massac, then branched out into lesser trails. Much of the "Grand Trace" is Illinois Route 145 and runs nearly all of its length south from Harrisburg, Illinois, through the Shawnee National Forest. This section of the state was part of an Indian reservation occupied for a time by about 6,000 Native Americans.  Like the buffalo, most of the Indians were gone by the early 1830s.

Dixon Springs takes its name from William Dixon, one of the first white settlers to build a home in this section, who obtained a school land warrant in 1848 from Governor Augustus C. French.  His cabin was a landmark for many years, as was an old log church on the adjoining knoll. A small community grew up at Dixon Springs with a general store, post office, blacksmith shop, grist mill, and several churches. Dixon Springs became a 19th-century health spa that attracted hundreds to the seven springs of mineral-enriched water.  A bathhouse provided mineral or soft water baths, hot or cold, available at any time.  The natural environment of the area and its stone formations helped to give the park valley a more equable temperature in the summer than most of southern Illinois.  This made the resort so popular that people came by steamboat excursions from as far away as Paducah, Kentucky, Evansville, Indiana, and Cairo to Golconda.  They then traveled by train to within a couple of miles of the park.

References 
 
 

Pre-statehood history of Illinois
Protected areas of Pope County, Illinois
State parks of Illinois
Protected areas established in 1946
1946 establishments in Illinois